Guilherme Rebelo de Andrade (1891 - 1969) was a Portuguese architect.

sources
↑ André Cruz. «O Estádio Nacional e os novos paradigmas do culto». Academia.edu. Consultado em 14 de Novembro de 2011
↑ «1939 – Prémio Valmor». Câmara Municipal de Lisboa. Consultado em 26 de março de 2008. Arquivado do original em 3 de abril de 2008
↑ «Cidadãos Nacionais Agraciados com Ordens Portuguesas». Resultado da busca de "Guilherme Rebelo de Andrade". Presidência da República Portuguesa. Consultado em 16 de abril de 2016

1891 births
1969 deaths
Portuguese architects